Torellella is a genus of problematic tubicolous fossils. They have slightly conical, phosphatic tubes with elliptical cross-section. Their fossils are known from the Cambrian.

References

Cambrian invertebrates
Cambrian animals of Europe
Enigmatic prehistoric animal genera
Paleozoic life of New Brunswick
Paleozoic life of Nova Scotia